The Weddell Sea Expedition 2019 is a 45 day expedition to the Weddell Sea, in Antarctica, that seeks to study the glaciology and biology at and near the Larsen C ice shelf. It will be the first expedition to investigate the area that Iceberg A-68 broke away from in July 2017.

In addition to the scientific objectives, the expedition will be in the region where Ernest Shackleton's ship, the Endurance, sank in 1915. Expedition Chief Scientist, Professor Julian Dowdeswell commented, "if we are that close to one of the most iconic vessels in polar exploration, we have got to go and look for it." The conditions in the Weddell Sea are challenging, even in summer when the sea ice is thinnest, which means the outcome of the search for the Endurance is highly uncertain.

References 

Antarctic expeditions